Ivan Oleksiyevych Boretz (died 1937) was a bandurist. Member of the Kiev, Kharkiv and later Poltava Bandurist Capellas. Director of the Horiv Bandura Ensemble. Arrested on 21 September 1937, shot on 11 November 1937. His family was informed that he had died on 12 February 1941. He was rehabilitated on 9 December 1957.

References

Cheremesky, K. Povernennia Tradytsiyi - Kharkiv,1999.

Kobzars
Bandurists
Ukrainian musicians
1937 deaths
Year of birth missing